Kevan David James (born 18 March 1961, Lambeth, London) is an English former first-class cricketer who spent most of his career with Hampshire whom he won the NatWest Trophy and Benson & Hedges Cup with in the early 1990s.

He was educated at the Edmonton County School, in the London Borough of Enfield.

A middle-order batsman and left-arm seam bowler, he toured Australia and the West Indies with Young England before forging a successful career with Hampshire. He also played some first-class cricket for Wellington in New Zealand. James is perhaps best known for a game against the Indians in 1996 when he took a record equaling four wickets in four balls, and followed it up with a hundred later in the match.  These Indian wickets included Sachin Tendulkar and Rahul Dravid.  The Cricinfo report from the match claimed that no-one, in the history of cricket, had taken four wickets in four balls and scored a hundred in the same game.
The second player to have accomplished a 4-in-4 and a century was Kelly Smuts, for Eastern Province (EP) against Boland at Paarl in 2015–16. Smuts had a magical game, scoring the only individual century of the game (108) in the only EP innings of 442, and capturing 7 for 36 and 6 for 35.

His brother, Martin, played List A cricket for Hertfordshire.

Since at least 2003, Kevan has been reporting on Hampshire for BBC Radio Solent and is currently the lead Hampshire commentator for the BBC's ball-by-ball radio coverage of county cricket.

References

External links
 

1961 births
English cricketers
Hampshire cricketers
Middlesex cricketers
Wellington cricketers
Living people
Cricketers from Greater London
People educated at Edmonton County School